Iraqis in Norway make up approximately 33,924 people. They are mostly refugees from the Iran–Iraq War, the Saddam regime and in particular the Iraq War. Iraqis are the seventh largest immigrant group in Norway after Poles, Lithuanians, 
Swedes, Syrians, Pakistanis and Somalis.

Demographics
, the Norwegian Statistisk Sentralbyrå reported that there were 28,935 Iraqis in Norway of which 21,784 are first generation immigrants and 7,151 are born in Norway to two Iraqi parents. Iraqis are a group of refugees with a relatively short duration of residence in Norway (80 per cent have lived in Norway less than 10 years). Around one fourth of all Iraqis in Norway lives in the city of Oslo.

Marriage
Due to a sizeable Iraqi population present in Norway, many have integrated and married Norwegians, as from 1996 to 2004, 179 marriages were contracted between a resident Iraqi man and a Norwegian woman, which makes up 19 per cent of the marriages of Iraqi men.

Notable people

See also
 Demographics of Norway
 Immigration to Norway

References

Asian diaspora in Norway